The Alazeya is a river in the northeastern part of Yakutia, Russia which flows into the Arctic between the basins of the larger Indigirka to the west and the Kolyma to the east.

Geography
The Alazeya is formed at the confluence of the Nelkan and Kadylchan rivers in the slopes of the Alazeya Plateau. It crosses roughly northwards through the tundra meandering among the flat, marshy areas of the Kolyma Lowland, part of the greater East Siberian Lowland. Finally the Alazeya drains into the Kolyma Bay of the East Siberian Sea, close to Logashkino. The river freezes in late September through early October and stays icebound until late May through early June. There are more than 24,000 lakes in its basin.

Tributaries

History

Dmitrii Zyryan was the first Russian to reach the Alazeya in 1641, but did not found a permanent settlement.

See also
List of rivers of Russia

References

Rivers of the Sakha Republic
East Siberian Lowland